The Call of Destiny (French: L'Appel du destin) is a 1953 French comedy drama film directed by Georges Lacombe and starring Jean Marais, Jacqueline Porel and Édouard Delmont.

Plot
While on tour, a conducting prodigy encounters his father for the first time. A formerly brilliant pianist he has declined into alcoholism and abandoned the family.

Cast 
 Jean Marais as Lorenzo Lombardi
 Jacqueline Porel as Lucienne Lombardi
 Roberto Benzi as  Roberto Lombardi
 Édouard Delmont as M. Galibert
 Georgette Anys as La grosse Lolo
 Renée Devillers as Germaine Obrecht
 Charles Dechamps as Monsieur Roze
 Fernand Sardou as Dottore Aldo Guarneri
 Germaine Pape as Mme Torquato
 Fernand Rauzéna as M. Torquato
 Jean Lanier as Crespi, l'ami
 Marcel Lebas as Le facteur
 Philippe Richard as Le directeur
 Julien Verdier as Dupont, le musicien
 Léon Walther as Count Amadeo, le critique

References

Bibliography
Oscherwitz,  Dayna & Higgins, MaryEllen. The A to Z of French Cinema. Scarecrow Press, 2009.

External links 
 
 L'Appel du destin (1953) at the Films de France

1953 films
French comedy-drama films
1950s French-language films
French black-and-white films
Films directed by Georges Lacombe
1953 comedy-drama films
1950s French films